The Catholic Secondary Schoolgirls' Sports Association (CaSSSA) is a sporting association for girls from fourteen Catholic secondary schools based in south-east Queensland, Australia. Competition is offered to girls from Years 7 to 12.

The association was formed in 2014 as an amalgamation of the Catholic Secondary Girls' Schools Sports Association (CSGSSA, which organised Swimming, Athletics, and Cross country), the Catholic Schools Tennis Association (CSTA, founded in 1930) and the Brisbane School Girls Sports Association (BSGSA, founded in 1996 and organising other team sports).

The championships for Swimming, Cross Country, and Track and Field (Athletics) are split into two competitions. The larger schools (9 in total) compete for the CaSSSA Cup while the other schools (5 in total) compete for the CaSSSA Shield.

Schools

Members

Sports 
A range of sports are offered during each trimester within a year.

See also
List of schools in Queensland
Head of the River (Queensland)

References

External links

Australian school sports associations
Sports governing bodies in Queensland
2014 establishments in Australia
Sports organizations established in 2014